Qaraqoyunlu (also, Karakoyunlu and Karakoyunly) is a village in the Goranboy Rayon of Azerbaijan.

References 

Populated places in Goranboy District